The Mustelidae (from Latin mustela, weasel) are a family of carnivorous mammals, including weasels, badgers, otters, martens, and wolverines. Mustelids are a diverse group and form the largest family in the suborder Caniformia of the order Carnivora with about 66 to 70 species in nine subfamilies.

Variety 

Mustelids vary greatly in size and behaviour. Wolverines can crush bones as thick as the femur of a moose to get at the marrow, and have been seen attempting to drive bears away from their kills. The sea otter uses rocks to break open shellfish to eat. Martens are largely arboreal, while  European badgers dig extensive tunnel networks, called setts. Only one mustelid has been domesticated; the ferret. Tayra are also kept as pets (although they require a Dangerous Wild Animals licence in the UK), or as working animals for hunting or vermin control. Others have been important in the fur trade—the mink is often raised for its fur.

Being one of the most species-rich families in the order Carnivora, the family Mustelidae also is one of the oldest. Mustelid-like forms first appeared about 40 million years ago (Mya), roughly coinciding with the appearance of rodents. The common ancestor of modern mustelids appeared about 18 Mya.

Characteristics 

Within a large range of variation, the mustelids exhibit some common characteristics. They are typically small animals with elongated bodies, short legs, short skulls, short, round ears, and thick fur. Most mustelids are solitary, nocturnal animals, and are active year-round.

With the exception of the sea otter, they have anal scent glands that produce a strong-smelling secretion the animals use for sexual signaling and marking territory.

Most mustelid reproduction involves embryonic diapause. The embryo does not immediately implant in the uterus, but remains dormant for some time. No development takes place as long as the embryo remains unattached to the uterine lining. As a result, the normal gestation period is extended, sometimes up to a year. This allows the young to be born under favorable environmental conditions. Reproduction has a large energy cost, so it is to a female's benefit to have available food and mild weather. The young are more likely to survive if birth occurs after previous offspring have been weaned.

Mustelids are predominantly carnivorous, although some eat vegetable matter at times. While not all mustelids share an identical dentition, they all possess teeth adapted for eating flesh, including the presence of shearing carnassials. One characteristic trait is a meat-shearing upper-back molar that is rotated 90°, towards the inside of the mouth.

Ecology 

The fisher, tayra, and martens are partially arboreal, while badgers are fossorial. A number of mustelids have aquatic lifestyles, ranging from semiaquatic minks and river otters to the fully aquatic sea otter, which is one of the few nonprimate mammals known to use tools while foraging. It uses "anvil" stones to crack open the shellfish that form a significant part of its diet. It is a "keystone species", keeping its prey populations in balance so some do not outcompete the others and destroy the kelp in which they live.

The black-footed ferret is entirely dependent on another keystone species, the prairie dog.

Animals of similar appearance 
Skunks were formerly included as a subfamily of the mustelids, but are now regarded as a separate family (Mephitidae). Mongooses bear a striking resemblance to many mustelids, but belong to a distinctly different suborder—the Feliformia (all those carnivores sharing more recent origins with the cats) and not the Caniformia (those sharing more recent origins with the dogs). Because mongooses and mustelids occupy similar ecological niches, convergent evolution has led to similarity in form and behavior.

Human uses 

Several mustelids, including the mink, the sable (a type of marten), and the stoat (ermine), possess furs that are considered beautiful and valuable, so have been  hunted since prehistoric times. From the early Middle Ages, the trade in furs was of great economic importance for northern and eastern European nations with large native populations of fur-bearing mustelids, and was a major economic impetus behind Russian expansion into Siberia and French and English expansion in North America. In recent centuries fur farming, notably of mink, has also become widespread and provides the majority of the fur brought to market.

One species, the sea mink (Neogale macrodon) of New England and Canada, was driven to extinction by fur trappers. Its appearance and habits are almost unknown today because no complete specimens can be found and no systematic contemporary studies were conducted.

The sea otter, which has the densest fur of any animal, narrowly escaped the fate of the sea mink. The discovery of large populations in the North Pacific was the major economic driving force behind Russian expansion into Kamchatka, the Aleutian Islands, and Alaska, as well as a cause for conflict with Japan and foreign hunters in the Kuril Islands. Together with widespread hunting in California and British Columbia, the species was brought to the brink of extinction until an international moratorium came into effect in 1911.

Today, some mustelids are threatened for other reasons. Sea otters are vulnerable to oil spills and the indirect effects of overfishing; the black-footed ferret, a relative of the European polecat, suffers from the loss of American prairie; and wolverine populations are slowly declining because of habitat destruction and persecution. The rare European mink (Mustela lutreola) is one of the most endangered mustelid species.

The ferret, a domesticated European polecat, is a fairly common pet.

Evolution and systematics 
The oldest known mustelid from North America is Corumictis wolsani from the early and late Oligocene (early and late Arikareean, Ar1–Ar3) of Oregon. Middle Oligocene Mustelictis from Europe might be a mustelid, as well. Other early fossils of the mustelids were dated at the end of the Oligocene to the beginning of the Miocene. Which of these forms are Mustelidae ancestors and which should be considered the first mustelids is unclear.

The fossil record indicates that mustelids appeared in the late Oligocene period (33 Mya) in Eurasia and migrated to every continent except Antarctica and Australia (all the continents that were connected during or since the early Miocene). They reached the Americas via the Bering land bridge.

The 68 recent mustelids (66 extant species) are classified into eight subfamilies in 22 genera:

Subfamily Taxidiinae
 Genus Taxidea
 American badger, T. taxus

Subfamily Mellivorinae
 Genus Mellivora
 Honey badger, M. capensis

Subfamily Melinae
 Genus Arctonyx
 Northern hog badger, A. albogularis
 Greater hog badger, A. collaris
 Sumatran hog badger, A. hoevenii
 Genus Meles
 Japanese badger, M. anakuma
 Asian badger, M. leucurus
 European badger, M. meles
 Caucasian badger, M. canescens

Subfamily Helictidinae
 Genus Melogale
 Vietnam ferret-badger, M. cucphuongensis
 Bornean ferret-badger, M. everetti
 Chinese ferret-badger, M. moschata
 Javan ferret-badger, M. orientalis
 Burmese ferret-badger, M. personata
 Formosan ferret-badger, M. subaurantiaca

Subfamily Guloninae
 Genus Eira
 Tayra, E. barbara
 Genus Gulo
 Wolverine, G. gulo
 Genus Martes
 American marten, M. americana
 Pacific marten, M. caurina
 Yellow-throated marten, M. flavigula
 Beech marten, M. foina
 Nilgiri marten, M. gwatkinsii
 European pine marten, M. martes
 Japanese marten, M. melampus
 Sable, M. zibellina
 Genus Pekania
 Fisher, P. pennanti

Subfamily Ictonychinae
 Genus Galictis
 Lesser grison, G. cuja
 Greater grison, G. vittata
 Genus Ictonyx
 Saharan striped polecat, I. libycus
 Striped polecat, I. striatus
 Genus Lyncodon
 Patagonian weasel, L. patagonicus
 Genus Poecilogale
 African striped weasel, P. albinucha
 Genus Vormela
 Marbled polecat, V. peregusna

Subfamily Lutrinae (otters)
 Genus Aonyx
 African clawless otter, A. capensis
 Asian small-clawed otter, A. cinerea
 Congo clawless otter, A. congicus
 Genus Enhydra
 Sea otter, E. lutris
 Genus Lontra
 North American river otter, L. canadensis
 Marine otter, L. felina
 Neotropical otter, L. longicaudis
 Southern river otter, L. provocax
 Genus Lutra
 Eurasian otter, L. lutra
 Hairy-nosed otter, L. sumatrana
  Japanese otter. L. nippon
 Genus Hydrictis
 Spotted-necked otter, H. maculicollis
 Genus Lutrogale
 Smooth-coated otter, L. perspicillata
 Genus Pteronura
 Giant otter, P. brasiliensis

Subfamily Mustelinae (weasels, ferrets, and mink)
 Genus Mustela
 Mountain weasel, M. altaica
 Stoat (Beringian ermine), M. erminea
 Steppe polecat, M. eversmannii
 Domestic ferret, M. furo
 Haida ermine, M. haidarum
 Japanese weasel, M. itatsi
 Yellow-bellied weasel, M. kathiah
 European mink, M. lutreola
 Indonesian mountain weasel, M. lutreolina
 Black-footed ferret, M. nigripes
 Least weasel, M. nivalis
 Malayan weasel, M. nudipes
 European polecat, M. putorius
 American ermine, M. richardsonii
 Siberian weasel, M. sibirica
 Back-striped weasel, M. strigidorsa
 Genus Neogale
 Amazon weasel, N. africana
 Colombian weasel, N. felipei
 Long-tailed weasel, N. frenata
 American mink, N. vison
 Sea mink, N. macrodon

Fossil mustelids
Extinct genera of the family Mustelidae include:

 Brachypsalis
 Chamitataxus
 Corumictis
 Cyrnaonyx
 Ekorus
 Enhydriodon
 Eomellivora
 Hoplictis
 Megalictis
 Oligobunis
 Plesictis
 Sthenictis
 Teruelictis
 Trochictis

Phylogeny
Multigene phylogenies constructed by Koepfli et al. (2008) and Law et al. (2018) found that Mustelidae comprises eight living subfamilies. The early mustelids appear to have undergone two rapid bursts of diversification in Eurasia, with the resulting species spreading to other continents only later.

Mustelid species diversity is often attributed to an adaptive radiation coinciding with the mid-Miocene climate transition. Contrary to expectations, Law et al. (2018) found no evidence for rapid bursts of lineage diversification at the origin of the Mustelidae, and further analyses of lineage diversification rates using molecular and fossil-based methods did not find associations between rates of lineage diversification and mid-Miocene climate transition as previously hypothesized.

See also
 List of heaviest extant mustelids

References

Further reading

External links

"The Mighty Weasel" (February 19, 2020) – Nature

 
Carnivorans
Mammal families
Extant Oligocene first appearances
Taxa named by Gotthelf Fischer von Waldheim